Dennis Jones (born 1958) is an American blues rock singer, guitarist, and songwriter. He has released seven albums since 2003. Jones has opened for shows by Johnny Winter, Buddy Guy and Dick Dale.

Life and career
He was bon in Monkton, Maryland, United States. Inspired by his parents record collection which included recordings by B.B. King and Bobby Bland, Jones asked if he could have a set of drums, but his parents reticence led to him getting a guitar instead for Christmas when he was 13 years old. While still in his teenage years, Jones played in a number of local bands, and commenced his love in writing songs. Following his graduation from high school, his parents organised a party at their home and his band performed.  By the age of 18, and with a feeling for adventure, Jones join the military, where he was stationed in Germany. He married, relocated back to Baltimore County, before moving on again to Los Angeles.  Jones secured a day job and played his music at the weekend, although his marriage fell apart after ten years. Jones formed one of his earliest bands in Los Angeles named Blackhead. He stated "It was a cross between Funkadelic, Aerosmith and Zeppelin and all original material. I had a singer that was wild. It was just a bunch of brothers playing alternative (music) that was not expected for us to do". When they parted company, Jones decided to attempt heading up a band playing the blues. He continued to play music throughout the 1990s, and played the lead guitar with the BusBoys in the early 2000s. 

Jones also played guitar with Zac Harmon, billed as Zac Harmon & the Mid-South Revue, and Jones played on their live album, Live at Babe and Ricky's Inn (2002).  In 2004, the ensemble won first place at the 20th International Blues Challenge. However, Jones and Harmon started having scheduling clashes over their respective band's availability, and Harmon sought a replacement for Jones. Jones then performed on the Pacific Legendary Rhythm & Blues Cruises. His debut solo album was Falling Up (2003), which was issued on his own record label, Blue Rock Records.  The track "Deep Blues" from Falling Up, was featured on the soundtrack to the 2006 film, Sea of Fear. Passion For The Blues (2006),  was his next album release. His 2009, Pleasure & Pain, album garnered a review who stated "Pulling in elements of vintage and gritty blues-rock... Jones gets it right more times than not throughout". Jones continued with his day job as an elevator technician, and toured part-time with his band, until he was made redundant and Jones was able to work full-time at his preferred craft.

My Kinda Blues, Jones's fourth solo album, was issued in 2012 and featured guest appearances from Kenny Neal, and Guitar Shorty. After the 2016 release, Both Sides of the Track, which had Jimmy Zavala play both saxophone and harmonica on the recording, Jones and his band recorded a live album, almost by chance. Jones noted, "'WE3' showcases some of my best songs. It wasn't a planned recording. They happened to have a full Pro Tools recording studio next to the stage and asked if they could record my show. It came out so well I decided to release it". 

Upon his returning from another tour in Europe, Jones started the song writing process for his seventh album, Soft Hard and Loud. The title referenced the dynamic range of Jones trio. It was released on October 16, 2020, and included all original material, and had Cornelius Mims making a guest appearance on several tracks.

Discography

Albums

References

External links
Official website

1958 births
Living people
American blues singers
American blues guitarists
American blues singer-songwriters
Blues rock musicians
African-American male guitarists
African-American male songwriters
Songwriters from Maryland
Guitarists from Maryland
People from Monkton, Maryland
20th-century African-American male singers
20th-century American guitarists
21st-century African-American male singers
21st-century American guitarists